The cementoenamel junction, frequently abbreviated as the CEJ, is a slightly visible anatomical border identified on a tooth.  It is the location where the enamel, which covers the anatomical crown of a tooth, and the cementum,  which covers the anatomical root of a tooth, meet. Informally it is known as the neck of the tooth.  The border created by these two dental tissues has much significance as it is usually the location where the gingiva attaches to a healthy tooth by fibers called the gingival fibers.

Active recession of the gingiva reveals the cementoenamel junction in the mouth and is usually a sign of an unhealthy condition.

There exists a normal variation in the relationship of the cementum and the enamel at the cementoenamel junction.  In about 60–65% of teeth, the cementum overlaps the enamel at the CEJ, while in about 30% of teeth, the cementum and enamel abut each other with no overlap.  In only 5–10% of teeth, there is a space between the enamel and the cementum at which the underlying dentin is exposed.

References

External links
Biology-Online

Dental enamel
Parts of tooth
Human mouth anatomy